Thomas Carl Veart (born 21 May 1970 in Whyalla, South Australia, Australia) is an Australian former footballer who is the head coach for Adelaide United.

Club career
He previously played in England for Sheffield United, Crystal Palace and Millwall. During his time at Crystal Palace he earned the affectionate title of "goal machine". Whilst at Sheffield United he is remembered for scoring the winning goal against Premier League side Arsenal in the 1995–96 FA Cup.

He scored the first ever goal in the newly formed Hyundai A-League against the Newcastle United Jets in a 1–0 opening day victory.

Veart retired from football on 23 May 2007, after Adelaide United's match against Vietnamese team Gach Dong Tam Long An in the AFC Champions League.

He works at Adelaide United, as the head coach.

International career
He made his debut for the Socceroos in 1992 and played 18 'A' matches, scoring 7 goals.

Honours
With Adelaide United:
 A-League Premiership: 2005–2006
With Adelaide City:
 NSL Championship: 1991–1992, 1993–1994
 NSL Cup: 1989, 1991–1992

Managerial statistics

References

External links
 Adelaide United profile
 Oz Football profile
 
 
 

1970 births
Living people
People from Whyalla
Association football forwards
Australian soccer players
Australian expatriate soccer players
Australia international soccer players
A-League Men players
FFSA Super League players
Premier League players
Salisbury United FC players
Adelaide City FC players
Adelaide United FC players
Crystal Palace F.C. players
Millwall F.C. players
Sheffield United F.C. players
National Soccer League (Australia) players
Olympic soccer players of Australia
Expatriate footballers in England
Australian expatriate sportspeople in England
Footballers at the 1992 Summer Olympics
1998 OFC Nations Cup players